Tzaneen Dam is an earth-fill type dam located on the Groot Letaba River, near Tzaneen, Limpopo, South Africa. After the cyclone Eloise that emanated from the Mozambique side, the dam was certified 110% full by the Department of Water and Sanitation. The dam supplies domestic water to Polokwane and Tzaneen, and irrigation water to the Letaba valley. The hazard potential of the dam has been ranked high (3).

See also
List of reservoirs and dams in South Africa
List of rivers of South Africa

References 

 List of South African Dams from the Department of Water Affairs

Dams in South Africa